QAMAR HOUSE, now known as EFU BUILDING, is designed in the Art Deco architectural style, by Qamardin Mahomed Hashwani in 1945 and was built on Muhammad Ali Jinnah Road in central Karachi between 1946 and 1955 by Qamardin & Co. It was the tallest building in Karachi until the construction of the Habib Bank Plaza building in 1968, of the AKFED (Aga Khan Fund for Economic Development).

Location 
Qamar House was built on Muhammad Ali Jinnah Road across from the Karachi Port Trust Building erected in colonial prepartition times, and in the vicinity of the Merewether Clock Tower another colonial preparation monument in Karachi.

Details 
Qamar House was designed by Qamardin Mahomed Hashwani in 1945 in the Art Deco style, and was built in partnership with Qamardin Jaffer Valliani and both their brothers and partners Ahmedali Mahomed Hashwani and Tajdin Jaffer Valliani by their Partnership Qamardin & Others. It has 12 floors, and is 129 feet in height. 

While Qamar House was being built its recognition spread beyond Pakistan. On 5 July 1957 Aga Khan III appointed Qamardin Mahomed Hashwani as his Honorary Architect for Pakistan. His appointment for Pakistan was reaffirmed by Aga Khan IV succeeding his grandfather, when he appointed Qamardin as Honorary Architect for life for various projects throughout Pakistan.

Qamar House
From inception in 1948 till 2002 Qamar House was initially owned by four original partners of Qamardin & Others: Qamardin Mahomed Hashwani 25%, Qamardin Jaffer Valliani 25%, Ahmed Ali Mahomed Hashwani 25%, Tajdin Jaffer Valliani 25%; subsequently, original four owners successively gifted of their 25% shares sub-fractionally to members within each of their nuclear families.

EFU 
It was acquired by EFU in 2002 to be the head office for Eastern Federal Union, the largest insurance company in Pakistan. Afterwards, it was officially named EFU House.

References

External links
Map of Qamar House, also known as EFU Building 
Qamar House or EFU Building in Karachi on YouTube

Towers in Karachi
Office buildings in Karachi
Art Deco architecture
Buildings and structures in Karachi
1957 establishments in Pakistan